Ladies' Date is a 1952-1953 American daytime television series that was broadcast on the DuMont Television Network. The program was an afternoon variety/audience participation show, hosted by Bruce Mayer, who had been the host of a similar series locally in Detroit.

Broadcast history
Ladies' Date was broadcast from New York's WABD-TV. The program aired Monday through Friday from 1pm to 1:30pm ET from October 13, 1952, to July 31, 1953.

Preservation status
As with most DuMont series, no episodes are known to exist.

See also
List of programs broadcast by the DuMont Television Network
List of surviving DuMont Television Network broadcasts
1952–53 United States network television schedule (weekday)

References

Bibliography
David Weinstein, The Forgotten Network: DuMont and the Birth of American Television (Philadelphia: Temple University Press, 2004) 
Alex McNeil, Total Television, Fourth edition (New York: Penguin Books, 1980) 
Tim Brooks and Earle Marsh, The Complete Directory to Prime Time Network TV Shows, Third edition (New York: Ballantine Books, 1964)

External links
Ladies' Date at IMDB
DuMont historical website

DuMont Television Network original programming
1952 American television series debuts
1953 American television series endings
Black-and-white American television shows
Lost television shows